The 2003 Wizard Home Loans Cup was the Australian Football League competition played in its entirety before the Australian Football League's 2003 Premiership Season began. The AFL National Cup is also sometimes referred to as the pre-season cup because it is played in its entirety before the Premiership Season begins. The final was won by Adelaide for the first time in its history, defeating Collingwood by 31 points

The AFL introduced a range of innovations for this pre-season competition, the Wizard Home Loans Cup, to make the game faster and more exciting. Five new rules changes were trialled in the competition, which in itself resorts back to a knock-out format after three years as a round-robin series. In the most notable innovation, players were awarded nine points for goals kicked outside the 50-metre arc in a move designed to bring the game’s longer kickers into play. The player must have his back foot on or beyond the 50m arc if kicking on the run and the player on the mark must be on or beyond the 50m arc if the kicker is taking a set shot. The ball can still bounce through for a goal. With a running shot at goal, the ball must leave the player’s back foot planted on or outside the 50m line.

The other rules trialled included:
 teams will concede three points for rushed behinds instead of one point.
 umpires calling play-on, and not awarding a mark, for players kicking backwards to team-mates outside the attacking 50m arc,
 the centre square will be expanded from 45 metres to 50 metres,
 defenders will also be able to kick out after a behind straight away, rather than wait for the goal umpire to wave his flags, in a move designed to speed up the game.

In other changes, the field umpires wore orange shirts and black shorts instead of the traditional white, while goal umpires waved different coloured flags for the different scores. The new rules were used in conjunction with those incorporated last year: an expanded interchange bench, and the ball to be bounced only for the start of the match, and then thrown up.

Games

Week 1

|- style="background:#ccf;"
|Home team||Home team score||Away team||Away team score||Ground||Crowd||Date
|- style="background:#fff;"
|  || 1.8.0.5 (62) ||  || 2.12.0.15 (105) || Telstra Dome || 16,990 || Friday, 21 February, 7:40 PM
|- style="background:#fff;"
|  || 1.13.0.13 (100) ||  || 1.11.1.5 (83) || Subiaco Oval || 32,701 || Friday, 21 February, 7:10 PM
|- style="background:#fff;"
|  || 0.8.0.9 (57) ||  || 1.15.1.17 (119) || Manuka Oval || 8,041 || Saturday, 22 February, 2:40 PM
|- style="background:#fff;"
|  || 0.11.1.13 (82) ||  || 1.7.0.8 (59)|| York Park || 11,427 || Saturday, 22 February, 2:40 PM
|- style="background:#fff;"
|  || 0.14.1.6 (93) ||  || 0.9.0.7 (61)|| Telstra Stadium || 8,276 || Saturday, 22 February, 7:40 PM
|- style="background:#fff;"
|  || 1.10.0.9 (78) ||  || 0.11.0.11 (77)|| AAMI Stadium  || 25,560 || Saturday, 22 February, 7:40 PM
|- style="background:#fff;"
|  || 4.7.0.9 (87) ||  || 2.19.0.14 (146) || Skilled Stadium || 8,406 || Sunday, 23 February, 2:40 PM
|- style="background:#fff;"
|  || 0.14.0.8 (92) ||  || 4.16.1.13 (148) || Telstra Dome || 20,893 || Sunday, 23 February, 6:10 PM

Week 2

|- style="background:#ccf;"
|Home team||Home team score||Away team||Away team score||Ground||Crowd||Date
|- style="background:#fff;"
|  || 1.10.0.11 (80) ||  || 0.17.0.4 (106) || Marrara Oval || 9,404 || Friday, 28 February, 7:10 PM
|- style="background:#fff;"
|  || 1.10.0.9 (78) ||  || 1.8.0.8 (65) || Telstra Dome || 10,311 || Saturday, 1 March, 7:40 PM
|- style="background:#fff;"
|  || 2.9.0.7 (79) ||  || 1.9.0.8 (71) || Bundaberg Rum Stadium || 8,150 || Saturday, 1 March, 7:40 PM
|- style="background:#fff;"
|  || 1.15.0.13 (112) ||  || 1.9.1.6 (72) || Telstra Dome || 19,556 || Sunday, 2 March, 6:10 PM

Semi finals

|- style="background:#ccf;"
|Home team||Home team score||Away team||Away team score||Ground||Crowd||Date
|- style="background:#fff;"
|  || 5.8.0.10 (103) ||  || 1.8.0.9 (66) || Telstra Dome || 24,728 || Saturday, 8 March, 6:10 PM
|- style="background:#fff;"
|  || 1.9.0.10 (73) ||  || 0.10.0.9 (69)|| AAMI Stadium  || 17,962 || Saturday, 8 March, 8:10 PM

Grand final

See also

 List of Australian Football League night premiers
 2003 AFL season

References
 
 Australian Football 150 Years > Home

Australian Football League pre-season competition
Wizard Cup